Lulworthia is a genus of fungi within the Lulworthiaceae family.

References

External links
Lulworthia at Index Fungorum

Sordariomycetes genera
Lulworthiales